The Public Woman is a 1984 French erotic drama film inspired by Fyodor Dostoevsky's 1872 novel Demons and directed by Andrzej Żuławski, starring Valérie Kaprisky, Lambert Wilson and Francis Huster as the lead actors. The film had a total of 1,302,425 admissions in France where it was the 28th highest-grossing film of the year.

Plot summary
An inexperienced young actress is invited to play a role in a film based on Dostoevsky's novel Demons. The film director, a Czech immigrant in Paris, takes over her life, and in a short time she is unable to draw the line between acting and reality. She winds up playing a real-life role posing as the dead wife of another Czech immigrant, who is manipulated by the filmmaker into committing a political assassination.

Awards

César Awards, France, 1985
Nominated
Best Actress - Valérie Kaprisky
Best Supporting Actor - Lambert Wilson
Best Writing - Adaptation - Andrzej Żuławski and Dominique Garnier

Montréal World Film Festival 1984
Won Most Popular Film - Andrzej Żuławski
Won Special Prize of the Jury - Andrzej Żuławski

DVD releases
The film had its English-speaking debut on DVD in late 2008, when new label Mondo Vision released the film as its debut title. The disc features a commentary from Andrzej Żuławski and a video interview, where he discusses Polish cinema and the film's production. The film is also available on DVD from LCJ Editions in France, IVC in Japan, and Minerva Pictures in Italy, but lack these extras.

References

External links 
 
 
Image comparison comparing the quality of different DVD releases
Bagatellen.com review
DVDTalk Review
DVD Times Review

1984 films
1980s erotic drama films
French erotic drama films
Films about actors
Films based on Russian novels
Films based on works by Fyodor Dostoyevsky
Films directed by Andrzej Żuławski
1984 drama films
1980s French-language films
1980s French films